Similipepsis is a genus of moths in the family Sesiidae.

Species
Similipepsis takizawai  Arita & Špatenka, 1989
Similipepsis yunnanensis  Špatenka & Arita, 1992
Similipepsis aurea  Gaede, 1929
Similipepsis ekisi  Wang, 1984
Similipepsis eumenidiformis  Bartsch, 2008
Similipepsis maromizaensis  Bartsch, 2008
Similipepsis osuni  Bakowski & Kallies, 2008
Similipepsis typica (Strand, [1913])
Similipepsis violacea  Le Cerf, 1911
Similipepsis bicingulata  Gorbunov & Arita, 1995
Similipepsis helicella  Kallies & Arita, 2001
Similipepsis lasiocera  Hampson, 1919
Similipepsis taiwanensis (Arita & Gorbunov, 2001)

References

Sesiidae
Taxa named by Ferdinand Le Cerf
Moth genera